The Paley Center for Media, formerly the Museum of Television & Radio (MT&R) and the Museum of Broadcasting, founded in 1975 by William S. Paley, is an American cultural institution in New York with a branch office in Los Angeles, dedicated to the discussion of the cultural, creative, and social significance of television, radio, and emerging platforms for the professional community and media-interested public.

It was renamed The Paley Center for Media on June 5, 2007, to encompass emerging broadcasting technologies such as the Internet, mobile video, and podcasting, as well as to expand its role as a neutral setting where media professionals can engage in discussion and debate about the evolving media landscape.

Locations
The New York City location is in the heart of Midtown Manhattan at 25 West 52nd Street between 5th and 6th Avenues. With a growing collection of content broadcast on radio and television, the Paley Center opened a branch in 1996 in Los Angeles located at 465 N Beverly Drive in Beverly Hills, near Rodeo Drive. The Beverly Hills museum closed in 2020.

New York
In 1975 the original Museum of Broadcasting was founded with a gift by William S. Paley of US$2 million (equivalent to $ million in ). It opened in Manhattan on November 9, 1976, occupying two floors in an office building at 1 East 53rd Street, near the corner of 53rd Street and Fifth Avenue. This location was adjacent to the Doubleday Book Store on Fifth Avenue.

In 1991 the Museum changed its name to The Museum of Television & Radio with a move into the William S. Paley Building. Designed by Philip Johnson and located at 25 West 52nd Street (adjacent to the famed 21 Club at 21 West 52nd Street), the 16-story building was itself renamed The Paley Center for Media in 2007. It has two front entrances: one on the left for office staff, and a public entrance on the right. The Alexander Mackendrick film Sweet Smell of Success (1957) has an exterior location scene with different angles revealing how the neighborhood looked in the years before the building was constructed.

The ground floor of the New York museum features the ticket and information area and the Steven Spielberg Gallery, used for exhibitions, receptions, and fund-raising events. Reservations to use the Library are made at the front desk. In addition to the elevator, a staircase on the first floor leads down to a large basement-level theater. The fourth floor has computers for visitors to search the collection. Program selections can be viewed on the computers, which are available both for individuals and for groups.

Los Angeles
In 1996 the Museum of Television & Radio in Los Angeles opened in a new building, located at 465 North Beverly Drive in Beverly Hills, designed by Richard Meier and named for Leonard H. Goldenson. When the Los Angeles building opened, it featured a collection duplicated from the tapes in the New York collection. Rooms were named for the celebrity sponsors: the Danny Thomas Lobby; the Aaron Spelling Reception Area; and the Garry Marshall Pool. Screenings were held in the 150-seat John H. Mitchell Theatre. The Ahmanson Radio Listening Room had headphones for use with five pre-programmed channels.

In early 2020, the museum at North Beverly Drive closed. The archives moved to the Beverly Hills Public Library, and the staff moved to an office in Century City.

Archives
The Paley Center for Media is committed to the idea that many television and radio programs are significant works and should be preserved for posterity's sake. Instead of collecting artifacts and memorabilia, the Paley Center comprises mostly screening rooms, including two full-sized theaters. Nearly 160,000 television shows, commercials, and radio programs are available in the Paley Center's library, and during each visit, viewers can select and watch shows at individual consoles, and radio programs are accessed through these same consoles.

Some television programs are from the 1940s with radio programs dating back to the 1920s. The earliest TV program in the Museum's collection is a silent film of NBC's 1939 production of Dion Boucicault's melodrama The Streets of New York (1857), with Norman Lloyd, George Coulouris, and Jennifer Jones.

The museum does not sell the material or permit it to leave the premises. Viewing copies of television programs are Hi-8mm video tape dubs. The originals are kept in a vault outside of New York City, and the collection is being digitized. The Paley Center has acquired many lost episodes of classic television shows and has produced documentary features about the history and impact of television and radio. In recent years, the center has sponsored advance viewing of the pilot episodes of each network's new programs.

Television and radio shows are added to the collection after archival discoveries and through donations from individuals and organizations. In 2002, the Museum held a showing of the previously unseen rehearsal film of Rodgers and Hammerstein's Cinderella telecast from March 17, 1957.  This rehearsal was found in the CBS vault while the Museum was on a quest for other "lost" Cinderella materials. It had been believed that on the night of the live broadcast the show was preserved on both kinescope and videotape and then transmitted to the West Coast. Seeking either of these, Jane Klain, the director of research at the New York facility, asked CBS to search their vaults. The CBS database listed three 16mm films featuring five-minute segments of Julie Andrews performing in the show. When the earliest one was brought from the CBS vault, it was discovered to be the full dress rehearsal.

The center is also known for its many discoveries involving daytime game shows. Episodes of destroyed shows such as High Rollers, Celebrity Sweepstakes, The Money Maze, the Chuck Woolery version of Wheel of Fortune, To Say the Least, and daytime Hollywood Squares episodes are all available for viewing in the library. Episodes of other game shows such as Tattletales, Let's Make a Deal, and The Gong Show are also in the library.

Programming and education

Seminars and interviews with public figures are conducted frequently, all of which are recorded and available for later viewing on individual consoles. Past seminar participants have included Lucille Ball, Carol Burnett, Dick Cavett, Alan Alda, Al Franken, John Frankenheimer, James Garner, Bob Hope, Roy Huggins, Jack Paar, Dennis Potter, Dick Van Dyke, and Gore Vidal. Also available for viewing are seminars featuring creators and cast members from TV shows, including The Larry Sanders Show, Seinfeld, King of the Hill, The Simpsons, South Park, The Daily Show with Jon Stewart, Arrested Development, House, Battlestar Galactica, and The League. Panel discussions have varied from what it was like to work with Orson Welles to a celebration of Roy Huggins's career.

The William S. Paley Television Festival, also known as PaleyFest, is an annual television festival hosted by the Paley Center in the Los Angeles area. Founded in 1984, the festival, held annually in the spring, features panels composed of the casts and prominent creative talent from popular television shows such as Community, Parks and Recreation, Mad Men, and Lost, among many others. The panels field questions from a moderator and a public audience and often present exclusive content from their respective series. The festival has been in many venues over its history, including the Los Angeles County Museum of Art Bing Theater, the Directors Guild of America theater, the Cinerama Dome, and the Saban Theatre in Beverly Hills. It was relocated to the larger Dolby Theatre in Hollywood in 2014.

Media Advanced Management Program
In 2010, The Paley Center for Media announced a partnership with IESE Business School to offer the Advanced Management Program in Media and Entertainment or the "Media AMP", a postgraduate level program for media and entertainment executives to preparing them for high level leadership roles in their companies.  Launched in January 2011, the program's goal is to bring executives up to speed on new business models, management techniques, and technologies. A key feature is access to leaders in the industry.

The Media AMP curriculum covers four modules over a six-month period. Three of the modules are held in New York, and one in Los Angeles. Key discussion topics include:  Value Creation; Digital Strategy; Accounting, Finance and Management Control; Content and Customers; Leadership; Production, Technology and Operations Management; Entrepreneurship and Innovation; IT Systems and Strategy; Managerial Economics and Decision Analysis; Marketing Strategy; and others.

See also
List of museums and cultural institutions in New York City
List of old-time radio people
List of old-time radio programs
List of U.S. radio programs
Museum of Broadcast Communications
Pavek Museum of Broadcasting

References

External links

Description of exhibits in Hollywood facility

Museums in Los Angeles
History of television in the United States
History of radio
Museums in Manhattan
Mass media museums in New York (state)
Media studies
Television studies
Media museums in California
Telecommunications museums in the United States
Television archives in the United States
Midtown Manhattan
Buildings and structures in Beverly Hills, California
Festivals in Los Angeles
Recurring events established in 1984
Television festivals